The Richard Guenther House in Oshkosh, Wisconsin, United States, is a large, fine Queen Anne house designed by Waters and built by Jacob Rheiner in 1888 for Richard W. Guenther. Guenther was a Prussian immigrant who owned a drug store in Oshkosh, became Wisconsin state treasurer, US Congressman, and consul to Mexico City, Frankurt, and Cape Town.  From 1906 to 1913 the large house hosted Dr. M. E. Corbett's new Lakeside Sanitorium and Training School for Nurses, the first hospital in Oshkosh, which later evolved into Mercy Medical Center.

Largely unaltered, the house was listed on the National Register of Historic Places in 1984 for its architectural significance, for its association with Guenther, and for its service as Oshkosh's first hospital.

References

Houses in Winnebago County, Wisconsin
Houses on the National Register of Historic Places in Wisconsin
Buildings and structures in Oshkosh, Wisconsin
National Register of Historic Places in Winnebago County, Wisconsin
Houses completed in 1888
Queen Anne architecture in Wisconsin